Barikeh-ye Sofla may refer to:
Barikeh-ye Sofla, Ilam
Barikeh-ye Sofla, Kermanshah